Knothe is a surname of German origin. Notable people with the surname include:

Dietrich Knothe (1929–2000), German conductor and choral conductor
Fritz Knothe (1903–1963), American baseball player
George Knothe (1898–1981), American baseball player
Jan Knothe (1912–1977), Polish architect, artist, graphic designer, writer, poet and diplomat
Noel Knothe (born 1999), German footballer

See also
Knoth

References

Surnames of German origin